Desmond Dinan, (born  1957) an Irish academic (originally from Cork), is the Jean Monnet Professor at the George Mason School of Public Policy, in Arlington, Virginia. He is the author of a number of textbooks on European integration and its history. He lives and works in the United States, where he is married and has three children.

Bibliography
 Dinan, Desmond (1993). Historical Dictionary of the European Community. Metuchen : The Scarecrow Press.
 Dinan, Desmond (1994). Ever Closer Union?: An Introduction to the European Community. Basingstoke : Palgrave Macmillan. 
 Dinan, Desmond (1999). Ever Closer Union?: An Introduction to European Integration. Basingstoke : Palgrave : Macmillan.
 Dinan, Desmond (2000). Encyclopedia of the European Union. Boulder : Lynne Rienner.
 Dinan, Desmond (2004). Europe Recast: A History of European Union. Basingstoke : Palgrave Macmillan.

References
bio on George Mason University
Book review on "Europe recast":
Jan-Henrik Meyer: "Review essay: Postwar European integration: Europe Recast" on: Dinan, Desmond: Europe Recast. A History of European Union. Basingstoke 2004. In: H-Soz-u-Kult, 22.09.2006, .

Irish scholars and academics
1957 births
Living people
George Mason University faculty